Eeles  (or Eells) is a surname and a given name. It may refer to:

 Francis Carolus Eeles (1876–1954), English liturgical scholar and church historian
 James Eells (1926–2007), American mathematician
 Nick Eeles (born 1961), British Army major general
 Rosalind Eeles, British geneticist and clinician
 Zoë Eeles (born 1975), Scottish actress
 Eeles Landström (born 1932), Finnish retired pole vaulter, politician and business executive